Kevin Wilson Piedrahita Velasco (born June 18, 1991) is an American soccer player who currently plays for Union Omaha in the USL League One.

Club career
Piedrahita began his career with Colombian club América de Cali where he made his professional debut on December 8, 2011 in a relegation playoff against Patriotas F.C.  The match ended in a 4-3 defeat on penalties which resulted in America being relegated to Categoría Primera B.

On March 5, 2021, Piedrahita signed with USL League One side Union Omaha.

Piedrahita scored for Union Omaha in a August 2022 match against North Carolina FC.

International career
Piedrahita's only international appearance came in the under-20 level on December 17, 2011 when he recorded a clean sheet in USA's 2-0 win over Canada.

References

External links

1991 births
Living people
American soccer players
American expatriate soccer players
Categoría Primera A players
América de Cali footballers
Águilas Doradas Rionegro players
La Equidad footballers
Leones F.C. footballers
Union Omaha players
American sportspeople of Colombian descent
Expatriate footballers in Colombia
United States men's under-20 international soccer players
Sportspeople from Queens, New York
Soccer players from New York City
Association football goalkeepers